Pinemat manzanita may refer to either of two species of the plant genus Arctostaphylos:

Arctostaphylos uva-ursi
Arctostaphylos nevadensis, native to western North America